Engina is a genus of sea snails, marine gastropod mollusks in the family Pisaniidae.

Species
Species within the genus Engina include:

 Engina albocincta Pease, 1860
 Engina alveolata (Kiener, 1836)
 Engina androyensis Fraussen, Monnier & Rosado, 2015
 Engina armillata (Reeve, 1846)
 Engina astricta (Reeve, 1846)
 Engina australis (Pease, 1871)
 Engina bonasia Martens, 1880
 Engina chinoi Fraussen, 2009
 Engina cinis (Reeve, 1846)
 Engina concinna (Reeve, 1846)
 Engina corinnae Crovo, 1971
 Engina cronuchorda Fraussen & Chino, 2011
 Engina cumingiana Melvill, 1895
 Engina curtisiana (E.A. Smith, 1884)
 Engina demani De Jong & Coomans, 1988
 Engina egregia (Reeve, 1844)
 Engina epidromidea Melvill, 1894
 Engina farinosa (Gould, 1850)
 Engina fasciata (Bozzetti, 2009)
 Engina frausseni Chino, 2015 
 Engina fuscolineata E. A. Smith, 1913
 Engina fusiformis Pease, 1865
 Engina goncalvesi Coltro, 2005
 Engina ignicula Fraussen, 2004
 Engina itzamnai (Watters, 2009) 
 Engina lanceolata (Kuroda & Habe, 1971)
 Engina lauta (Reeve, 1846)
 Engina layardi Melvill, 1895
 Engina lignea Watters & Fraussen, 2015
 Engina lineata  (Reeve, 1846)
 Engina livida (G.B. Sowerby I, 1832)
 Engina macleani Olsson, 1971
 Engina magnifica Fraussen, Monnier & Rosado, 2015
 Engina mandarinoides Fraussen & Chino, 2011
 Engina mantensis Bartsch, 1928
 Engina maura (G.B. Sowerby I, 1832)
 Engina mendicaria (Linnaeus, 1758)
 Engina menkeana (Dunker, 1860)
 Engina mirabilis Fraussen & Stahlschmidt, 2015
 Engina mundula Melvill & Standen, 1885
 Engina muznoides Fraussen & Van Laethem, 2013
 Engina natalensis Melvill, 1895
 Engina notabilis Fraussen & Chino, 2011
 Engina obliquecostata (Reeve, 1846)
 Engina ovata Pease, 1865
 Engina permixta Watters & Fraussen, 2015
 Engina phasinola (Duclos, 1840)
 Engina polychloros (Tapparone-Canefri, 1880)
 Engina pulchra (Reeve, 1846):
 Engina pyrostoma (G.B. Sowerby I, 1832)
 Engina resta (Iredale, 1940)
 Engina ryalli Rolan & Fernandes, 1995
 Engina siderea (Reeve, 1846)
 Engina solida Dall, 1917
 Engina spica Melvill & Standen, 1895
 Engina strongi Pilsbry & Lowe, 1932
 Engina tabogaensis Bartsch, 1931
 Engina trifasciata  L. A. Reeve, 1846 
 Engina tuberculosa Pease, 1862
 Engina turbinella (Kiener, 1836)
 Engina williamsae Watters & Fraussen, 2015
 Engina zea Melvill, 1893
 Engina zepa (Duclos, 1883)
 Engina zonalis (Lamarck, 1822)

The Indo- Pacific Molluscan Database also includes the following names in current use 

 Engina idosia (Duckos in Chenu, 1848 in 1843–53)
Taxon inquirendum
 Engina anakisia (Duclos, 1850) 
Nomen dubium
 Engina leucozonia A. H. Verrill, 1950 
Species brought into synonymy
 Engina angulata G. B. Sowerby III, 1888: synonym of Peristernia angulata (G. B. Sowerby III, 1888)
 Engina bicolor (Cantraine, 1835): synonym of Enginella leucozona (Philippi, 1844)
 Engina contracta (Reeve, 1846): synonym of Clivipollia contracta (Reeve, 1846)
 Engina costata Pease, 1860: synonym of Clivipollia costata (Pease, 1860) (original combination)
 Engina demanorum De Jong & Coomans, 1988: synonym of Engina demani De Jong & Coomans, 1988 (unjustified emendation)
 Engina dicksoni Petuch, 2013: synonym of Engina itzamnai (Watters, 2009)
 Engina fragaria (W. Wood, 1828): synonym of Clivipollia fragaria (W. Wood, 1828)
 Engina gannita Hedley, 1914: synonym of Clivipollia contracta (Reeve, 1846)
 Engina gibbosa Garrett, 1872: synonym of Clivipollia recurva (Reeve, 1846)
 Engina histrio (Reeve, 1846): synonym of Engina alveolata (Kiener, 1836)
 Engina incarnata (Deshayes, 1834): synonym of Pollia incarnata (Deshayes, 1830)
 Engina janowskyi Coltro, 2005: synonym of Engina demani De Jong & Coomans, 1988
 Engina jugosa (C. B. Adams, 1852): synonym of Hesperisternia jugosa (C. B. Adams, 1852)
 Engina leucozona (Philippi, 1843): synonym of Enginella leucozona (Philippi, 1843)
 Engina mactanensis Cernohorsky, 1985: synonym of Engina spica Melvill & Standen, 1895
 Engina monilifera Pease, 1860: synonym of Morula echinata (Reeve, 1846)
 Engina nodicostata Pease, 1868: synonym of Morula nodicostata (Pease, 1868)
 Engina nodulosa Pease, 1869: synonym of Orania nodulosa (Pease, 1869)
 Engina papuensis (Tapparone Canefri, 1879): synonym of Clivipollia pulchra (Reeve, 1846)
 Engina parva Pease, 1868: synonym of Morula cernohorskyi Houart & Tröndle, 1997
 Engina paulucciae (Tapparone Canefri, 1879): synonym of Clivipollia incarnata (Deshayes, 1834)
 Engina perlata (Küster, 1858): synonym of Engina natalensis Melvill, 1895
 Engina purpureocincta Preston, 1909: synonym of Oppomorus purpureocinctus (Preston, 1909)
 Engina rawsoni (Melvill, 1897): synonym of Pollia rawsoni (Melvill, 1897)
 Engina reevei Tryon, 1923: synonym of Engina alveolata (Kiener, 1836)
 Engina schrammi Crosse, 1863: synonym of Muricopsis schrammi (Crosse, 1863)
 Engina slootsi De Jong & Coomans, 1988: synonym of Morula biconica (Blainville, 1832)
 Engina striata Pease, 1868: synonym of Morula striata (Pease, 1868)
 Engina variabilis Pease, 1868: synonym of Morula variabilis (Pease, 1868)
 Engina willemsae De Jong & Coomans, 1988: synonym of Ameranna willemsae (De Jong & Coomans, 1988)
 Engina xantholeuca G. B. Sowerby III, 1882: synonym of Morula dichrous (Tapparone Canefri, 1880)
 Engina zatricium Melvill, 1893: synonym of Engina bonasia (Martens, 1880)
 Engina zonata Reeve: synonym of Engina turbinella (Kiener, 1836)

References

 Fraussen K. & Chino M. (2011) Notes about Engina J.E. Gray, 1839 (Gastropoda: Buccinidae) with description of three new species from the West Pacific. Visaya 3(3): 63-75

Pisaniidae